Valtu is a village in Rapla Parish, Rapla County in northwestern Estonia.
 
Valtu Manor (in Swedish Waldau, in Estonian Valtu mõis) is a ruined and partially rebuilt manor in Valtu. The first record of the manor was in 1412. From 1588-1828 the Tiesenhausen family owned the manor and it was later owned by families named  Stackelberg, Ungern von Sternberg, and Meidel. During this time it was considered to be a work of classic Estonian architecture.

The main building was burned during the Revolution of 1905.  Its ruins were destroyed, but several outbuildings have been restored. A Dutch windmill built about 1815 on the site and the Manor are officially listed as part of Estonia's cultural heritage.

References

External links 
 Eesti mõisaportaal: Valtu mõis
 EHA: Valtu mõisa omanikud

Villages in Rapla County